Mendieta is a Basque surname. Notable people with the surname include:

Ana Mendieta, Cuban-American artist
Ascención Mendieta (1925–2019), Spanish activist
Carlos Mendieta, Cuban politician
Gaizka Mendieta, Spanish footballer
Gerónimo de Mendieta, Franciscan missionary and historian
Junior Mendieta (born 1993), Argentine footballer
Víctor René Mendieta Jr. (born 1982), footballer
William Mendieta, Paraguayan footballer

Basque-language surnames